John Johnstone (c. 1896 – 1952) was a Scottish footballer who played for Dundee, Aston Villa and Reading, mainly as a right half.

He played twice in Aston Villa's run to the 1924 FA Cup Final, but did not take part in the match itself; this was indicative of his struggles over several seasons to be selected ahead of Frank Moss and George Blackburn, both of whom were England internationals.

References

Scottish footballers
Footballers from Dundee
People educated at the High School of Dundee
Association football wing halves
1890s births
Date of birth unknown
1952 deaths
Date of death unknown
Montrose F.C. players
Dundee United F.C. players
Dundee F.C. players
Aston Villa F.C. players
Reading F.C. players
English Football League players
Scottish Football League players